Derly Stefany Castaño Cardozo (born 11 January 1994), known as Stefany Castaño, is a Colombian footballer who plays as a goalkeeper for Deportivo Cali and the Colombia women's national team.

International career
Castaño was part of the Colombia squad for the 2012 Summer Olympics, in which she did not make an appearance, and the 2015 FIFA Women's World Cup, in which she played in two of Colombia's four matches and conceded three goals.

References

External links

1994 births
Living people
Women's association football goalkeepers
Colombian women's footballers
Footballers from Bogotá
Colombia women's international footballers
2015 FIFA Women's World Cup players
Olympic footballers of Colombia
Footballers at the 2012 Summer Olympics
Footballers at the 2015 Pan American Games
Pan American Games gold medalists for Colombia
Pan American Games medalists in football
Footballers at the 2019 Pan American Games
Graceland Yellowjackets women's soccer players
Colombian expatriate women's footballers
Colombian expatriate sportspeople in the United States
Expatriate women's soccer players in the United States
Colombian expatriate sportspeople in Greece
Expatriate women's footballers in Greece
Colombian expatriate sportspeople in Spain
Expatriate women's footballers in Spain
Medalists at the 2019 Pan American Games
Medalists at the 2015 Pan American Games
Elpides Karditsas players
Málaga CF Femenino players
Colo-Colo (women) footballers